Boleslavski, Boleslavsky, Boleslawski, or Boleslawsky are surnames of Slavic origin. They can refer to:

 Isaac Boleslavsky, Soviet chess player
 Richard Boleslawski, Polish director and actor